The following is a list of association football clubs based in Uganda.

A
Alpha Young FC (Kiryandongo)
Athletic Club Kampala 
Alur United
Al-shadad (Kampala)

B
Biharwe F.C. (Biharwe)
Bitumastic FC (Kampala)
Boroboro FC (Lira)
Bright Stars FC (Kampala)
Bul FC (Jinja)
Bunamwaya SC (Wakiso)
Bweyale Town Council (Kiryandongo)
 Budondo FC (Jinja)
 Battle Storm FC(Bugiri)
Butambala Hills FC (Butambala) 
Bulindo young FC(Wakiso)

C
Coffee United SC (Kakira)
CRO FC (Mbale)
DANIDA FC (JINJA Masese)slogan ″The Masese Boys″

E
Eastern talents soccer academy

Edgars Football Club (Kampala)

Y
Ediofe Hills FC (Arua)
Entebbe Young Football Club (Kampala)
Express FC (Kampala)
Elgon Soccer Club (Found in Busiu Town Council - Mbale district.)

F
Fire Masters FC (Kampala)
Fire fire FC
Fasial international fc mbale

G
Gaddafi FC (Jinja)
God's Army FC (kawaala)
Gulu United FC (Gulu)
Gomba Lions

H
Hoima FC (Hoima)
Heritage Football Club Uganda
Homeland FC

J
Jinja Municipal Council Hippos FC (Jinja)
Jaguar FC

K
Kayabwe town council FC (Kayabwe)
kakajjo fc (jinja)
Kampala Capital City Authority FC (Kampala)
Kawempe United Football Club (Kampala)
Kazo United (Kampala)
Kiira Young FC (Kampala)
Kilembe Mines FC (Kilembe)
Kirinya-Jinja SS FC (Busoga United FC)
 Kibuye FC (Kibuye)
Kazo City
Kase
Katanga FC
Kamunana FC(Kawempe)
Katwe United

L
Lweza FC (Kampala)
Lungujja Galaxy sc
Luweero FC
Luzira United

M
Maroons FC (Kampala)
Masaka Local Council FC (Masaka)
Mbale Heroes Football Club (Mbale)
Mbarara United FC (Mbarara)
 Mbarara City F.C. (Mbarara)
Mpumudde fc (Jinja)
Mbogo United

N
Nile Breweries FC (Jinja)
Nabweru FC
Nabweru United
Nansana United
Nsambya United(Kampala)

O
Onduparaka FC (Arua)

P
Police FC (Kampala)
Police FC (Wakiso) (Wakiso)
Proline FC (Kampala)
Parombo United(Nebbi), accessed 6 June 1989]>/ref>*Parombo United (Nebbi)

R
Rwenshama FC (Kampala)
 Rubaga Youth FC (Jinja)

S
Sadolin Paints FC (Bugembe)
SC Villa (Kampala)
Simba FC (Bombo)
Soana FC (Kampala)
Skyran UG FC (Kassanda)
Santander Fc( Fort portal)
Sky sports SC (Mbale)
Sseguku United
Super heroes Fc
Sparten FC

T
The Saints FC (Kampala)

U
Uganda Revenue Authority SC (Kampala)
Umeme FC (Jinja)
UTODA FC (Kampala)

V
Victoria University SC (Kampala)
Victors FC (Kampala)
Vipers SC (Wakiso Town)
Walukuba West FC (Jinja)

W

Y
Youth Path Academy

Z

References

 
Uganda
Football
Football clubs